Harold Thomas Gibson was an English professional footballer who played as a left back in the Football League for Clapton Orient.

Personal life 
Gibson fought with the 17th (Service) and 21st (Service) Battalions of the Middlesex Regiment for the majority of the First World War and rose to the rank of sergeant. He was commissioned as a lieutenant in the 1st (Service) Battalion of the Royal Guernsey Light Infantry on 27 August 1918. Wounds received during the course of Gibson's service caused his retirement from football in 1918. After the war, it was reported that he met an American woman and emigrated to the USA.

Career statistics

References

Year of birth missing
Date of death missing
People from Hoxton
English footballers
English Football League players
Association football midfielders
Leyton Orient F.C. players
British Army personnel of World War I
Middlesex Regiment soldiers
Military personnel from Middlesex
Royal Guernsey Light Infantry officers
English emigrants to the United States
Footballers from the London Borough of Hackney